Fission, a splitting of something into two or more parts, may refer to:

 Fission (biology), the division of a single entity into two or more parts and the regeneration of those parts into separate entities resembling the original
 Nuclear fission, when the nucleus of an atom splits into smaller parts
 Fission (band), a Swedish death metal band
 Fission (album), by Jens Johansson

See also
 Fusion (disambiguation)